Iguaba Grande is a municipality located in the Brazilian state of Rio de Janeiro. Its population was 28,837 (2020) and its area is 54 km².

References

Municipalities in Rio de Janeiro (state)